"Come from the Heart" is a country music song written by Richard Leigh and Susanna Clark and published in 1987.  It is most known through the 1989 single by Kathy Mattea, released in conjunction with her album Willow in the Wind, though the song was first recorded and released on the 1987 Don Williams album Traces and also released in 1988 by Clark's husband on his album Old Friends.

Mattea's single was her third number one on the country chart, spending  14 weeks on that chart including a single week at the top.

Hard Working Americans (with front man Todd Snider) recorded the song in 2014 as a duet with Rosanne Cash.

Misattribution 
The song includes the lyrics:
You’ve got to sing like you don’t need the money,
Love like you’ll never get hurt.
You’ve got to dance like nobody’s watchin’.

which The Yale Book of Quotations attributes as the source for similar aphorisms sometimes attributed to others (e.g. Annie's Mailbox attributes a version of the lyric to a combination of William Watson Purkey and Satchel Paige). In 2004 in response to an inquiry by a group of librarians Richard Leigh stated

Chart performance

Year-end charts

References

Songs written by Richard Leigh (songwriter)
Song recordings produced by Allen Reynolds
1987 songs
1989 singles
Don Williams songs
Kathy Mattea songs
Mercury Records singles